Charles Anthony Snell (born Charles Anthony Schnell; November 29, 1893 – April 4, 1988), was a Major League Baseball catcher who played in  with the St. Louis Browns. He batted and threw right-handed.  Snell had a .211 batting average in 8 games, 4 hits in 19 at-bats, in his one-year career.

After his time, with St. Louis, he played minor league baseball with the Montgomery Rebels and Memphis Chickasaws of the Southern Association in 1913, the two Toronto teams in 1914 and the Chambersburg Maroons of the Blue Ridge League in 1915.

He was born in Hampstead, Maryland, and died in Reading, Pennsylvania.

External links

1893 births
1988 deaths
Major League Baseball catchers
Baseball players from Maryland
St. Louis Browns players
Montgomery Rebels players
Memphis Chickasaws players
Toronto Maple Leafs (International League) players
Toronto Beavers players
Chambersburg Maroons players
People from Hampstead, Maryland